Seymen (Turkish: seymen or seğmen, Persian: segban, similar to the Ottoman Turkish rank sekban) was a rank in the Seljuk military, introduced at the time of the Battle of Manzikert in 1071. After the Seljuk triumph in Manzikert (Turkish: Malazgirt), the seymens became the protectors of the Turkic tribes which had started to settle in Anatolia. 

They were used as a police force in Konya for a period, but were temporarily disbanded after the Mongol invasions of Anatolia which started with the Battle of Köse Dağ in 1243, to be reintroduced later by the Ottoman Beylik in the end of the 13th and beginning of the 14th centuries. 

In Ottoman society, the seymen tradition continued to exist as a paramilitary organization. They were known for their unique uniforms and arms. During the Turkish War of Independence (1919–1922), the seymens took up arms once again and fought against the invading forces. Ankara, the stronghold of the seymens, ultimately became the capital of the Turkish Republic in 1923.

Today, wearing seymen clothes in national holidays has become a tradition in Anatolia, especially in Ankara and other provinces of the Central Anatolia Region. The traditional seymen dance, also associated with the province of Ankara, is known as misket. Seymen is also a Turkish personal name, as well as a toponym.

See also
Sekban
Martolos

References

Military units and formations of the Ottoman Empire
Infantry units and formations
Turkish words and phrases
Auxiliary military units

Turkish culture